Sakda Joemdee (born April 7, 1982) is a Thai retired professional footballer who played as a defensive midfielder. Sakda has Vietnamese nationality due to his long time careers at Vietnam on 17 January 2009 with name Đoàn Văn Sakda.

International career
Joemdee made two appearances for the Thailand national football team at the 2004 AFC Asian Cup finals in China.

International goals

Honours

International
Thailand U-23
 Sea Games Gold Medal: 2003, 2005

Thailand
 ASEAN Football Championship: 2002

References

External links
 

1982 births
Living people
Sakda Joemdee
Naturalized citizens of Vietnam
Sakda Joemdee
Association football midfielders
Sakda Joemdee
Hoang Anh Gia Lai FC players
Sakda Joemdee
Sakda Joemdee
V.League 1 players
Thai expatriate footballers
Thai expatriate sportspeople in Vietnam
Expatriate footballers in Vietnam
Sakda Joemdee
Footballers at the 2002 Asian Games
2004 AFC Asian Cup players
Vietnamese people of Thai descent
Sakda Joemdee
Southeast Asian Games medalists in football
Competitors at the 2003 Southeast Asian Games
Competitors at the 2005 Southeast Asian Games
Sakda Joemdee
Thai emigrants to Vietnam